Kentucky Route 69 (KY 69) is a  state highway in Kentucky that runs from Bluff Lane near Central City to Indiana State Road 237 on the Bob Cummings – Lincoln Trail Bridge at the Kentucky-Indiana state line just northeast of Hawesville via Centertown, Hartford, Dundee, Fordsville, and Hawesville.

Major intersections

References

0069
Transportation in Ohio County, Kentucky
Transportation in Hancock County, Kentucky